Rico Morack (born 18 February 1988) is a German footballer who played in the 2. Bundesliga for TuS Koblenz in the 2009–10 season. In the 2014–15 season he played for Vikotria Berlin. He joined the reserve squad of Hertha BSC on 1 July 2015.

References

External links

1988 births
Living people
German footballers
Hertha BSC II players
TuS Koblenz players
SV Babelsberg 03 players
2. Bundesliga players
3. Liga players
Regionalliga players
TSG Neustrelitz players
Association football central defenders
FC Viktoria 1889 Berlin players
People from East Berlin
Footballers from Berlin